Gaia: One Woman's Journey is the fifteenth studio album released by Olivia Newton-John on 26 July 1994. For the first time, Newton-John wrote all the songs and co-produced the album.

Production and reception
Gaia was Newton-John's first album since she was diagnosed with breast cancer in 1992. Many of the songs were written about her experience, such as "Why Me" and "Not Gonna Give into It", as well as her interest in conservation. Gaia was recorded in Australia during 1993 and 1994 and released by several independent labels internationally, except in Australia where Newton-John was still signed to Festival Records. Gaia eventually saw its US release in 2002 by Hip-O Records and in 2022 by Primary Wave Music. The album was praised by critics and fans. AllMusic called it "the most honest and inviting album of her career." The lead single "No Matter What You Do" reached the Top 40 in Australia. The CD-Single track listing for "No Matter What You Do" included: "Original Version", "Smash Radio Edit" and "Smash Extended Version". "Don't Cut Me Down" was the second single released in Australia.

The songs "Don't Cut Me Down" and "Not Gonna Give In to It" were released as a part of Olivia's Live Concert set list on the "One Woman's Live Journey" cd in 2000 on Hip-O Records. "Not Gonna Give In to It" was later apart of the set list for the live concert DVD release of "Olivia Newton-John Live in Sydney" in 2008.

The song "Don't Cut Me Down" was later used in the film "It's My Party" in 1996. The song "Trust Yourself" was later used in two films featuring Newton-John, Sordid Lives in 2000 and The Wilde Girls in 2001. The song was later covered by Delta Goodrem in the mini-series Olivia Newton-John: Hopelessly Devoted to You and the accompanying soundtrack album, I Honestly Love You.

Track listing
All songs by Olivia Newton-John.

"Trust Yourself" – 5:40
"No Matter What You Do" – 4:22
"No Other Love" – 3:35
"Pegasus" – 5:11
"Why Me" – 4:59
"Don't Cut Me Down" – 4:14
"Gaia" – 7:28
"Do You Feel" – 4:22
"I Never Knew Love" – 2:48
"Silent Ruin" – 3:43
"Not Gonna Give into It" – 3:42
"The Way of Love" – 4:15

Personnel

Musicians
 Olivia Newton-John – lead vocals, backing vocals (1, 5, 11, 12)
 Murray Burns – keyboards (1, 2, 4–12), bass (1, 2, 5, 7, 9)
 Colin Bayley – guitars (1, 7, 9, 12), electric guitar (2), acoustic guitar (3, 5, 6, 10), tambourine (6), keyboards (7, 11, 12), drums (9), percussion (9), bass (11, 12), backing vocals (12)
 Dan Harris – guitars (1, 4, 7, 11), acoustic guitar (3, 8), electric guitar (5), ambient guitar (6)
 Dennis Wilson – acoustic guitar (2), steel guitar (2), lap steel guitar (2)
 Kevin Bayley – pedal steel guitar (5, 9), acoustic guitar (8), guitars (9)
 Greg Lyon – fretless bass (3)
 Jack Thorncraft – double bass (8, 10)
 Steve Hopes – drums (1, 2, 5, 7), percussion (3, 5, 11), hi-hat (12)
 Matt Ledgar – congas (1), percussion (3, 5, 11)
 Steve Nugent – percussion (11)
 Don Burrows – clarinet (3), flute (4), bamboo flute (7), bass flute (8), alto flute (10)
 Xue Bing Ellingworth – erhu (6, 7)
 Jarwin Jugurmurra – didgeridoo (7)
 John Hoffman – flugelhorn (11)
 Johnny Amobi – backing vocals (1, 5, 12)
 Risina Antonio – backing vocals (1, 5)
 Jojo Smith – backing vocals (5)
 Grace Knight – backing vocals (11)
 Elizabeth Lord – backing vocals (11)
 Rous School Choir – backing vocals (12)

Production
 Producers – Olivia Newton-John, Colin Bayley and Murray Burns.
 Engineers – Colin Bayley, Murray Burns, Glen Phirnister and John Sayers.
 Recorded at Music Farm Studios (Byron Bay, New South Wales).
 Mixing – Kevin Shirley (Tracks 1, 2 and 5); Bob Clearmountain (Tracks 3, 4 & 6–12).
 Mix assistant on tracks 3, 4 and 6–12 – Mick Patterson
 Mixed at MIX THIS! (Los Angeles, CA).
 Mastered by Leon Zervos at Abosute Audio (New York, NY).
 Art direction – Gabrielle Raumberger
 Design – Gabrielle Raumberger and Dylan Tran
 Photography – Peter Carrette and Alberto Tolot
 Typography – Dylan Tran
 Management – Bill Sammeth Organization

Charts

Weekly charts

Year-end charts

Certifications

References

1994 albums
Olivia Newton-John albums